Neckargemünd station is a railway station in the municipality of Neckargemünd, located in the Rhein-Neckar-Kreis in Baden-Württemberg, Germany.

References

Railway stations in Baden-Württemberg
Buildings and structures in Rhein-Neckar-Kreis